A Dark so Deadly is a novel by Stuart MacBride which is set in the fictional town of Oldcastle. Whilst this is a stand alone novel, its setting of Oldcastle and the use of one of its characters, Dr Alice MacDonald, provide a link to the two Ash Henderson novels (Birthdays for the Dead and A Song for the Dying). A Dark so Deadly was the first novel in a run of seven books for Stuart MacBride not to have debuted at number one in the book charts.

Plot
Detective Constable Callum MacGregor is in the Misfit Mob. This is where Police Scotland deposit their outcasts, troublemakers and those whom it wishes to get rid of but cannot. Callum is in the Misfit Mob because he screwed up the forensics at a crime scene, which allowed a known killer to walk free from court. Everyone thinks he accepted a bribe from the killer to deliberately contaminate the scene. Trouble is, MacGregor didn't ruin the crime scene; it was his pregnant girlfriend who was on her last warning, which would have meant her getting sacked and not receiving maternity leave or pay. So MacGregor takes the blame earning him the job in the Misfit Mob.

Whilst there, he has to deal with police finding his mum's remains (25 years after she went missing), finding out that his long lost twin brother is a rapper with an attitude and a fake accent and a serial killer who is mummifying his victims. He is hardly welcomed with open arms by the haiku-speaking Sergeant and his own big boss is revealed to not only be his supposed baby's real father, but he is also having an affair with MacGregor's girlfriend.

References

2017 British novels
Novels set in Scotland
Novels by Stuart MacBride
HarperCollins books